Opuzen is a small town in Dubrovnik-Neretva County in Croatia. This settlement is known as a major center of tangerine production in Croatia.

Opuzen got its name from its fortress, Fort Opus. The fortress was built by the Republic of Venice in 1684. Ruins of the fortress that remain are called Recycle and are part of the old town wall. The center of the old part of Opuzen is a classic Roman Forum. In the Middle Ages, Opuzen was known as Posrednica. The Republic of Ragusa in the 14th century had major trading markets (mainly trading in salt) in Opuzen. The markets got burnt down in 1472. The first Community School was opened in 1798 and was the only school in the Neretva region until 1845.

In the town is located Opuzen's Parish church of St. Stephen and it is in the main square

Important cultural and sport events related to Opuzen  and the local countryside are "The Melodies of the Croatian South"  and Opuzen Boat Marathon. The marathon is held on the river Neretva and about 35 boats participate each year.

Opuzen has several sports clubs:

 NK Neretvanac - founded in 1932
 RK Opuzen - established in 1977
 ZRK Neretvanka Opuzen - founded in 1989

The partisan war soldier, Stjepan Filipović, was born in Opuzen in 1916. The local school was named after him between 1942 and 1992.

Demographics
The total population of Opuzen is 3,254 (census 2011), in the following settlements:
 Buk Vlaka, population 492
 Opuzen, population 2,729
 Pržinovac, population 33

References

External links 

 

Populated places in Dubrovnik-Neretva County
Cities and towns in Croatia